Ram Kishan Gupta is an Indian politician. He was elected to the Lok Sabha, lower house of the Parliament of India as a member of the  Indian National Congress.

References

External links
 Official biographical sketch in Parliament of India website
India MPs 1967–1970
Lok Sabha members from Haryana
Indian National Congress politicians
1918 births
Year of death missing